No Manches Frida (also known as El profesor sustituto) is a 2016 comedy film, a remake of the German film Fack ju Göhte. The film stars Omar Chaparro and Martha Higareda in the lead roles. It was produced by Lionsgate and released in the United States on 2 September 2016, by Pantelion Films. The cinema chain AMC Theatres put the film into general distribution in the United States and Mexico in September 2016. A sequel, No Manches Frida 2, was released in March 2019.

Cast
Omar Chaparro as Ezequiel "Zequi" Alcántara 
Martha Higareda as Miss Lucy
Mónica Dionne as Miss Gaby
Rocio Garcia as Jenny
Fernanda Castillo as Miss Carolina
Regina Pavón as Mónica
Carla Adell as Laura
Mario Morán as Cristobal
Karen Furlong as Nayeli
Memo Dorantes as Romo 
Raquel Garza as Miss Ingrid
Adal Ramones as Mr. Valdez
Norma Angelica as Lic. Lopez
Susana Ayala as Lucha
Pamela Moreno as Cuquis
Brigitte Bozzo as Marifer
Miriam Calderon as Miss Gimena

Box office
No Manches Frida grossed $11.5 million in the US and Canada, and $12 million in other territories (including $3.2 million in Mexico), for a worldwide total of $23.5 million.

It made $3.7 million in its opening weekend in the United States (and $4.8 million over the four-day Labour Day Weekend).

Sequel
A sequel was announced Pantelion Films in October 2016. The full title was revealed as No Manches Frida 2 and was given a 15 March 2019 release.

References

External links
 
 
 

Mexican comedy films
2016 films
2016 comedy films
2010s high school films
Remakes of German films
2010s Mexican films